{{DISPLAYTITLE:C14H10O4}}
The molecular formula C14H10O4 (molar mass: 242.23 g/mol) may refer to:

 Benzoyl peroxide
 Diphenic acid
 Moracin M
 Oxalic acid diphenyl ester

Molecular formulas